The 2013 PDC World Youth Championship was the third edition of the PDC World Youth Championship, a tournament organised by the Professional Darts Corporation for darts players aged between 14 and 21.

The knock-out stages from the last 64 to the semi-finals were played in Barnsley on 22 March 2013. The final took place on 16 May 2013, before the final of the 2013 Premier League Darts, which was shown live on Sky Sports.

James Hubbard was the defending champion, but he was knocked out in the first round by Matthew Dicken. Michael Smith and Ricky Evans contested the final at The O2 Arena, London, with Smith winning 6-1.

Prize money

Qualification
The tournament featured 64 players. The top 52 players in the PDC Youth Tour Order of Merit automatically qualified for the tournament, with the top eight players being seeded. They were joined by 12 international qualifiers.

The participants were:

1-52

International qualifiers
  Oisin Daly
  Dirk van Duijvenbode
  Dean Finn
  Sergio Garcia
  Kai Gotthardt
  Teemu Harju
  Max Hopp
  Harley Kemp
  Dan Lauby Jr
  Shaun Narain
  Rowby-John Rodriguez
  Jackson Wilson-Young

Draw

References

World Youth Championship
PDC World Youth Championship
PDC World Youth Championship
2013